The Bund der Deutschen Katholischen Jugend (BDKJ) is the umbrella of Catholic youth organizations in Germany.

Member organizations
 Aktion West-Ost
 Bund der St. Sebastianus Schützenjugend (BdSJ)
 Christliche Arbeiterjugend (CAJ)
 DJK-Sportjugend (youth organization of DJK-Sportverband)
 Deutsche Pfadfinderschaft Sankt Georg (DPSG)
 Jugendverbände der Gemeinschaft Christlichen Lebens (J-GCL)
 Katholische junge Gemeinde (KjG)
 Katholische Landjugendbewegung (KLJB)
 Kolpingjugend
 Katholische Studierende Jugend (KSJ)
 Pfadfinderinnenschaft Sankt Georg (PSG)
 Quickborn Arbeitskreis
 Unitas-Verband

References

External links
 Homepage of BDKJ

Youth organisations based in Germany
Catholic youth organizations
Catholic Church in Germany